The 2009 Portland Timbers season was the ninth season for the club in the United Soccer Leagues First Division (USL-1), the second tier of the United States soccer pyramid. The first competitive game of the 2009 season was played on April 25 at Swangard Stadium in Burnaby, BC versus Vancouver Whitecaps FC which the Timbers lost 1–0. Following that loss the Timbers went on a 24-game unbeaten streak in the league on their way to securing the Commissioner's Cup for finishing the regular season atop the table. In a hard-fought, two-legged series, Vancouver Whitecaps FC knocked Portland out of the playoffs in the semifinals by an aggregate score of 5–4. In the U.S. Open Cup the Timbers hosted Seattle Sounders FC of Major League Soccer in the third round but were eliminated by their bitter rivals 2–1 in front of 16,382 spectators at PGE Park in Portland, Oregon.

Preseason

Regular season

April

May

June

July

August

September

Postseason

Competitions

USL First Division

League standings

† Austin deducted two points for fielding an ineligible player on July 25, 2009

Results summary

Results by round

USL-1 Playoffs

Playoff bracket
Teams were re-seeded for semifinal matchups

Semifinals

U.S. Open Cup

Cup bracket
Second Round winners advance to play one of 8 MLS clubs in 16-team knockout tournament
Home teams listed on top of bracket

First round

Second round

Third round

Cascadia Cup

Club 

<div style="float:left; width:47%;">

Coaching staff

Top scorers
Players with 1 goal or more included only.

Disciplinary record
Players with 1 card or more included only.

Goalkeeper stats
All goalkeepers included.

Player movement

Transfers in
Permanent

Loan

Transfers Out
Permanent

Loan

Notes

2009
American soccer clubs 2009 season
2009 United Soccer Leagues
2009 in sports in Oregon
2009 in Portland, Oregon